The Leibniz Institute for Psychology (German: Leibniz-Institut für Psychologie, short form ZPID) is a research support organization located in Trier, Germany. ZPID belongs to the Leibniz Association. In 2017, Michael Bosnjak became full-time director. On 1 January 2022, Claudia Dalbert became acting director.

ZPID directors
The following persons have been director of the institute:
 1972 – 1979: Günther Reinert
 1979 – 2003: Leo Montada
 2004 – 2017: Günter Krampen
 July 2017 – December 2021: Michael Bosnjak
 since 1 January 2022: Claudia Dalbert

Funding
The ZPID is funded by the Federal Ministry of Health (Germany) and by the sixteen German states within the framework of the joint federal-state funding of the member institutions of the Leibniz Association. In its home state of Rhineland-Palatinate, ZPID is assigned to the ministry responsible for science.

Products and services
 Information search (Search portal accessing several reference databases PubPsych)
 Database (Publication references PSYNDEX)
 Study planning (PsychNotebook)
 Preregistration (Platform RegReports)
 Data collection (PsychLab)
 Data analysis (PsychNotebook)
 Archiving (discipline-specific psychology repository PsychArchives, psychometric test respository OpenTestArchive)
 Publication (Publishing platform PsychOpen)

Cooperation partners

References

External links

Leibniz Association
Psychology institutes
Psychology organisations based in Germany